Nadja Brand (also known as Nadya Brand), is a South African-born actress and producer, most famously known for her leading role in Broken, for which she won the 2007 Fright Meter Award for Best Actress in a Leading Role. (2006). Brand has also starred in The 13th Sign, Dust, and The Devil's Chair.

Early life and career
Brand was born in Johannesburg, South Africa, and later moved to Cape Town to complete her acting studies in 1998. After her marriage to director Adam Mason, she moved to the UK, where she started up her own production company, Paranoid Celluloid, in 2001. She has starred as the lead in 4 internationally released feature films. She has also produced 5 feature films, 65 music videos, and four short films. She recently starred in Arno Carstens' Battlescars Galactica.

Personal life
Brand married director Adam Mason in 2001 and moved to the UK. The couple divorced in 2006. She has a daughter from another relationship. She currently resides in Cape Town, where she acts, produces, and has started her career as a director. Brand has also started her own acting classes in Cape Town.

Filmography

Acting

References

External links
 Official website
 
 
 
 
 
 
 
 
 
 
 
 

South African film actresses
Living people
1975 births
People from Johannesburg